Galvez: Hanggang sa Dulo ng Mundo Hahanapin Kita is a 1993 Philippine action film directed by Manuel "Fyke" Cinco. It stars Eddie Garcia as the titular protagonist and Edu Manzano.

The film is streaming online on YouTube.

Plot
After being sentenced to twice the reclusion perpetua for raping and murdering a woman, Marvin (Edu) vows to take revenge on top lawyer Efren (Eddie).

Cast
Eddie Garcia as Efren Galvez
Edu Manzano as Marvin Esguerra
Cristina Gonzales as Carla
Pilar Pilapil as Patricia
Sunshine Cruz as Roselle
Christopher Rojas as Junie
Jaime Fabregas as Serante
Berting Labra as David
Dick Israel as Daniel
Jess Ramos as Bert
Marithez Samson
Delia Razon
Ernie Zarate
Nanding Fernandez as Andoy
Joseph Serra as Judge

References

External links

Full Movie on Regal Entertainment

1993 films
1993 action films
Filipino-language films
Films shot in the Philippines
Philippine action films
Regal Entertainment films
Films directed by Manuel Cinco
1990s English-language films